MH6 may refer to:

Monster Hunter Rise
MD Helicopters MH-6 Little Bird